Ronny Henríquez (born June 20, 2000) is a Dominican professional baseball pitcher for the Minnesota Twins of Major League Baseball (MLB).

Career

Texas Rangers
Henríquez signed with the Texas Rangers as an international free agent on July 3, 2017, for a $10,000 signing bonus. Henríquez made his professional debut in 2018 for the DSL Rangers of the Rookie-level Dominican Summer League, going 5–0 with a 1.55 ERA and 79 strikeouts over 58 innings. He played for the Hickory Crawdads of the Class A South Atlantic League in 2019, going 6–6 with a 4.55 ERA and 99 strikeouts over 82 innings. Henríquez did not play in 2020 due to the cancellation of the Minor League Baseball season because of the COVID-19 pandemic. Henríquez opened the 2021 season with the Hickory Crawdads of the High-A East, going 1–3 with a 3.75 ERA and 27 strikeouts over 24 innings. He was promoted to the Frisco RoughRiders of the Double-A Central on June 10. With Frisco he went 4–4 with a 5.04 ERA and 78 strikeouts over  innings. On November 19, 2021, Texas selected Henríquez to the 40–man roster.

Minnesota Twins
On March 12, 2022, Texas traded Henríquez and Isiah Kiner-Falefa to the Minnesota Twins in exchange for Mitch Garver.

See also
 List of Major League Baseball players from the Dominican Republic

References

External links

2000 births
Living people
Major League Baseball players from the Dominican Republic
Major League Baseball pitchers
Minnesota Twins players
Dominican Summer League Rangers players
Hickory Crawdads players
Frisco RoughRiders players
St. Paul Saints players
Dominican Republic expatriate baseball players in the United States